The QR class were a  class of diesel locomotives in New Zealand and Tasmania. Originally built by Clyde Engineering between 1965 and 1966 as Queensland Rail's 1460 class locomotives. They were purchased by Tranz Rail in 1995 to be rebuilt, as a cheaper alternative to buying new locomotives. Seven were modified into the QR class. Three were leased to AN Tasrail for one year, but the locos were later sold in 2001. All three have since been scrapped.

Introduction and service 
Following the rebuilding of the DQ and QR class locomotives at Tranz Rails Hutt Workshops, Tranz Rail sold three QRs accompanied the second batch of DQ class locomotives due to a locomotive shortage due to the planned replacement of Tasrails English Electric locomotive fleet. The locos left the Port of Wellington on 8 December 1998 on the Arktis Dream, and arrived in Bell Bay on 15 December 1998. They were still painted in the Cato Blue livery, still with Tranz Rails winged logo still painted on. The logo was later modified with "Tranz Rail" being replaced by "Tasrail". The locos were used as slave units only (as they were in New Zealand) due to lacking of the radio and other equipment as what are fitted to other lead locomotives. The locomotives were also occasionally used for yard shunts.

Withdrawal and disposal 
As of April 2017, all three locomotives have been scrapped. The three locos never saw much service in the first few years, with 2062 and 2102 being placed into storage within the first year of service, with 2056 following not long after. The three later returned to service. QR 2102 withdrawn after a major engine failure in July 2002. 2056 was again withdrawn in August 2005. By 2008, only 2062 remained in service. The loco was generally on the Melba Line, but was occasionally used on the South Line. This loco was withdrawn by November 2009. The locos were all stored at East Tamar Workshops after their withdrawals. The locos were then transported to OneSteel's scrap yard in Bell Bay in June 2012, where they were scrapped a couple of months later.

See also

 New Zealand DQ and QR class locomotives
 Queensland Railways 1460 class

References

Clyde Engineering locomotives
Co-Co locomotives
Diesel locomotives of Queensland
Diesel locomotives of Tasmania
Queensland Rail locomotives
Railway locomotives introduced in 1997
3 ft 6 in gauge locomotives of Australia
Diesel-electric locomotives of New Zealand
Diesel-electric locomotives of Australia